Kim Yong-joon is a South Korean voice actor who joined the Munhwa Broadcasting Corporation's Voice Acting Division in 1997. Currently, he is cast in the Korea TV Edition of "CSI: Crime Scene Investigation" as Al Robbins, replacing Robert David Hall.

Roles

Broadcast TV
CSI: Crime Scene Investigation (replacing Robert David Hall, Korea TV Edition, MBC)
Shadow Fighter (MBC)
24 (extra guest, Korea TV Edition, MBC)
Dr. Slump (Korea TV Edition, MBC)
Pipi (Korea TV Edition, MBC)
Bumerang Fighter (MBC)
Bittle Juice (Korea TV Edition, MBC)
Crayon Shin-chan (Movie of Korea TV Edition, MBC)
Tommy & Oscar (Korea TV Edition, MBC)
Cartoon Fight-Raviham Polis (radio drama, MBC)
Cartoon Fight-Red Moon (radio drama, MBC)
Cartoon Fight-Samkookji (radio drama, MBC)
Dolphin Plliper (Korea TV Edition, MBC)
Tom and Jerry (Korea TV Edition, MBC)
Wa! e-Nice World (narration, MBC)

See also
Munhwa Broadcasting Corporation
MBC Voice Acting Division

External links
Daum Cafe Voice Actor Kim Yong Joon Homepage (in Korean)
MBC Voice Acting division Kim Yong Joon blog (in Korean)
Ad Sound Kim Yong Joon blog (in Korean)

Living people
South Korean male voice actors
Year of birth missing (living people)